Brevity codes are used in amateur radio, maritime, aviation and military communications. The codes are designed to convey complex information with a few words or codes. Some terms are classified to the public.

List of brevity codes 
 ACP-131 Allied military brevity codes
 ARRL Numbered Radiogram
 Commercial codes such as the Acme Commodity and Phrase Code, the ABC Telegraphic Code, Bentley's Complete Phrase Code, and Unicode
 Fox (code word)
 Multiservice tactical brevity code used by various military forces. The codes' procedure words, a type of voice procedure, are designed to convey complex information with a few words, when brevity is required but security is not
 Ten-code, North American police brevity codes, including such notable ones as 10-4
 Phillips Code
 NOTAM Code
 Wire signal, Morse Code abbreviation, also known as 92 Code. Appears in informal language-independent HAM conversations
 World War II Allied names for Japanese aircraft

See also 
 Operating signals
 SINPO code, code used to describe the quality of radio transmissions, especially in reception reports written by shortwave listeners
 R-S-T system, information about the quality of a radio signal being received. Used by amateur radio operators, shortwave listeners
 Morse code abbreviations
 Telegraphese
 List of HTTP status codes

External links 
 Brevity codes on the RadioReference wiki